Order of Orange or Orange Order or variant may refer to:

 Orange Order of Northern Ireland
 Orange Order in Canada
 Independent Orange Order of Belfast
 Order of the House of Orange of the Netherlands, dynastic knighthood order
 Order of Orange-Nassau of the Netherlands, chivalric order

See also
 Orange (disambiguation)
 Order (disambiguation)
 Orange Free State Command, South Africa army force division